Mycetophagus confusus is a species of hairy fungus beetle in the family Mycetophagidae. It is found in North America.

References

Further reading

 

Tenebrionoidea
Articles created by Qbugbot
Beetles described in 1878